Stuart Michael Schmidt, Jr. is an American politician. He is a member of the Maryland House of Delegates for District 33B in Anne Arundel County, Maryland.

Background
Schmidt graduated from Glen Burnie High School in 1998. He later attended Salisbury University, where he earned his Bachelor's degree, and the University of Baltimore, where he received his Master of Business Administration degree. Schmidt operates his own realty business, called Schmidt Home Consultants (a Keller Williams Realty independent franchise). 

In 2022, Schmidt filed to run for the Maryland House of Delegates in District 33, later being redrawn into District 33B. He won the Republican primary on July 19, 2022, receiving 70.4 percent of the vote, and later won the general election on November 8.

In the legislature
Schmidt was sworn into the Maryland House of Delegates on January 11, 2023. He is a member of the House Judiciary Committee.

Personal life
Schmidt is married to his wife, Michele. Together, they have one child and live in Crofton, Maryland.

Electoral history

References

External links
 

21st-century American politicians
Republican Party members of the Maryland House of Delegates
Living people
Salisbury University alumni
University of Baltimore alumni
Year of birth missing (living people)